The Galician Party of the Proletariat (PGP) was a party galician independentist and Marxist-Leninist party formed in March 1978, as a continuation of Galician People's Union-Proletarian Line, a split of the original Galician People's Union. The Central Committee was clandestine, and even the party militants didn't know the members of it. Tha party supported armed struggle, which considered as anti-imperialist and anti-oligarchic. Its official magazine was called Sempre en Galiza.

History
In 1979 Galician Unity included, as independent candidates, several militants of the PGP in their lists for the municipal elections. In those elections the PGP got three of its members elected as town councillors (Santiago de Compostela, Monforte de Lemos and Vilaboa). The PGP also constituted a platform that ran the elections in the municipality of Vigo and supported other lists, obtaining 2 town councillors in Salvaterra de Miño. The PGP also presented several lists, under the common name of Agrupación Electoral Galicia Ceibe in other towns, without gaining any representation.

After the local elections, the party formed Galiza Ceibe-OLN as its mass front and Loita Armada Revolucionaria as its armed wing. The emergence of Loita Armada Revolucionaria caused the police arrest in 1980 of several leaders of the organization, including Xosé Luís Méndez Ferrín. The party also had a remarkable influence in the Intersindical Nacional dos Traballadores Galegos.

The party stopped working in 1980.

References

Sources
Miguel Anxo Fernández Baz, A formación do nacionalismo galego contemporáneo (1963-1984), Santiago de Compostela, 2003.

1978 establishments in Spain
1980 disestablishments in Spain
Defunct communist parties in Spain
Defunct socialist parties in Galicia (Spain)
Galician nationalist parties
Left-wing nationalist parties
Political parties disestablished in 1980
Political parties established in 1978
Secessionist organizations in Europe